The Albert Russel Erskine Trophy was an annual award presented in the United States from 1929 to 1931 to the college football team recognized as national champions by a group of American sportswriters.

Trophy

The Erskine trophy is made of plate silver, in the form of a loving cup with two handles. It is inscribed with the words:

The selected national champions for 1929, 1930, and 1931 are inscribed below, with room to spare for subsequent champions.

The trophy was last awarded immediately following the 1932 Rose Bowl. In later years the trophy was held by the Newport Sports Museum until its closure in 2014, after which the trophy was sold at auction.

Winners

For 1932, unbeaten Michigan was mentioned as receiving the "Rockne – Erskine trophy" in recognition of their title as national champions. No winner is engraved upon the Erskine Trophy for 1932.

References

College football championship trophies